BACnet is a  communication protocol for building automation and control (BAC) networks that use the ASHRAE, ANSI, and ISO 16484-5 standards protocol.

BACnet was designed to allow communication of building automation and control systems for applications such as heating, ventilating, and air-conditioning control (HVAC), lighting control, access control, and fire detection systems and their associated equipment. The BACnet protocol provides mechanisms for computerized building automation devices to exchange information, regardless of the particular building service they perform.

History
The development of the BACnet protocol began in June, 1987, in Nashville, Tennessee, at the inaugural meeting of the ASHRAE BACnet committee, known at that time as SPC 135P, "EMCS Message Protocol". The committee worked at reaching consensus using working groups to divide up the task of creating a standard. The working groups focused on specific areas and provided information and recommendations to the main committee. The first three working groups were the Data Type and Attribute Working Group, Primitive Data Format Working Group, and the Application Services Working Group.

BACnet became ASHRAE/ANSI Standard 135 in 1995, and ISO 16484-5 in 2003. The Method of Test for Conformance to BACnet was published in 2003 as BSR/ASHRAE Standard 135.1. BACnet is under continuous maintenance by the ASHRAE Standing Standard Project Committee 135.

BACnet had an almost immediate impact on the HVAC controls industry. In 1996 Alerton announced a BACnet product line for HVAC controls, from the operator's workstation to small variable air volume (VAV) controllers. Automated Logic Corporation and Delta Controls soon followed suit. On July 12, 2017, BACnet reached a milestone with the issuance of the 1000th Vendor ID. Vendor IDs are assigned by ASHRAE and are distributed internationally. Those vendor identifiers can be viewed at the BACnet website.

H. Michael (Mike) Newman, Manager of the Computer Section of the Utilities and Energy Management Department at Cornell University, served as the BACnet committee chairman until June, 2000, when he was succeeded by his vice-chair of 13 years, Steven (Steve) Bushby from NIST.

During Steve Bushby's four-year term as committee chair the BACnet standard was republished twice, in 2001 and 2004, each time with new capabilities added to the standard. The 2001 version featured, among other things, extensions to support fire / life-safety systems.

In June, 2004, 17 years after the first BACnet meeting and back in Nashville, William (Bill) Swan (a.k.a. "BACnet Bill") from Alerton began his four-year stint as committee chair. During his term the number of committee working groups grew to 11, pursuing areas such as support for lighting, access control, energy utility/building integration, and wireless communications.

In January 2006 the BACnet Manufacturers Association and the BACnet Interest Group of North America combined their operation in a new organization called BACnet International .

In June 2008, in Salt Lake City, Dave Robin from Automated Logic Corporation took over the reins as the new committee chair after serving 4 years as vice chair.

In June 2012, in San Antonio, Carl Neilson from Delta Controls took over the reins as the new committee chair after serving 4 years as vice chair. Carl stepped down as chair in June 2015.

In June 2015, Bernhard Isler, from Siemens, became chair after serving 3 years as vice chair and 4 years as secretary. During Bernhard's term, 10 addenda were published for the 135-2016 standard. Once addenda to 135.1-2013 was also published. Bernhard stepped down as chair in June 2018.

In June 2018, Michael Osborne from Reliable Controls, became chair after serving 3 years as secretary and 3 years as vice chair.

Protocol overview
The BACnet protocol defines a number of services that are used to communicate between building devices. The protocol services include Who-Is, I-Am, Who-Has, I-Have, which are used for Device and Object discovery. Services such as Read-Property and Write-Property are used for data sharing. As of ANSI/ASHRAE , the BACnet protocol defines 60 object types that are acted upon by the services.

The BACnet protocol defines a number of data link and physical layers, including ARCNET, Ethernet, BACnet/IP, BACnet/IPv6, BACnet/MSTP, point-to-point over RS-232, multidrop serial bus with token passing over RS-485, Zigbee, and LonTalk.

BACnet objects
ANSI/ASHRAE 135-2016 specifies 60 standard object types:

 Access Credential
 Access Door
 Access Point
 Access Rights
 Access User
 Access Zone
 Accumulator
 Alert Enrollment
 Analog Input
 Analog Output
 Analog Value
 Averaging
 Binary Input
 Binary Lighting Output
 Binary Output
 Binary Value
 BitString Value
 Calendar
 Channel
 CharacterString Value
 Command
 Credential Data Input
 Date Pattern Value
 Date Value
 DateTime Pattern Value
 DateTime Value
 Device
 Elevator Group
 Escalator
 Event Enrollment
 Event Log
 File
 Global Group
 Group
 Integer Value
 Large Analog Value
 Life Safety Point
 Life Safety Zone
 Lift
 Lighting Output
 Load Control
 Loop
 Multi-state Input
 Multi-state Output
 Multi-state Value
 Network Port
 Network Security
 Notification Class
 Notification Forwarder
 Octetstring Value
 Positive Integer Value
 Program
 Pulse Converter
 Schedule
 Structured View
 Time Pattern Value
 Time Value
 Timer
 Trend Log
 Trend Log Multiple

BACnet testing
BACnet Testing Laboratories ("BTL") was established by BACnet International to test products to BACnet standards and support compliance testing and interoperability testing activities and consists of BTL Manager and the BTL working group ("BTL-WG").
The general activities of the BTL are:
Publishing the BTL Implementation Guidelines document
Certifying the products per BACnet testing and BTL guidelines
Supporting the activities of the BTL-WG
Maintaining the BTL test packages
Approving Testing Laboratories for BTL Testing
The BTL also provides testing services through BACnet Laboratories. The BTL Managers and BTL working groups of BACnet International administer the test Laboratories. All BTL-recognized BACnet Test Organizations are ISO 17025 accredited.

In January, 2017, a new BTL certification program was announced. Under this program, the work of the BTL and WSPCert (the European BACnet certification body) is merged. This merger forms a single point of testing for both the BTL Mark and the Certificate of Conformance.

References

External links
 BACnet website
 BACnet International 
 Open Source BACnet Stack in C

Computer-mediated communication
Network protocols
Building automation